Sithu, a former Burmese royal title and modern given name, may refer to:

Kings
 Sithu I, King of Pagan (r. 1112–1167)
 Sithu II, King of Pagan (r. 1174–1211)
 Sithu III, King of Pagan (r. 1251–1256)
 Sithu IV, King of Pagan (r. 1256–1287)
 Sithu of Pinya, King of Pinya (r. 1340–1344)
 Sithu Kyawhtin, King of Ava (r. 1551–1555)

Royalty, viceroys and governors
 Sithu Min Oo, Pretender to Pinya throne (1325–1364)
 Sithu Thanbawa, Prince of the Five Irrigated Districts (r. 1380s–1390s?)
 Thray Sithu of Myinsaing, Governor of Myinsaing (r. 1386–1426)
 Sithu of Paukmyaing, Governor of Paukmyaing (r. 1402–?)
 Sithu I of Yamethin, Governor of Yamethin (r. 1400/01–1413)
 Sithu Kyawhtin of Toungoo, Viceroy of Toungoo (Taungoo) (r. 1470–1481)
 Min Sithu of Toungoo, Viceroy of Toungoo (r. 1481–1485)

Modern usage
 Sithu Aye (born 1990), Scottish-Burmese guitarist, musician, and producer based in Scotland
 Sithu Win, Burmese footballer
 Sithu Win (actor), Burmese actor and model